The Wisconsin Avenue Line, designated as Routes 31 or 33, is a daily bus route operated by the Washington Metropolitan Area Transit Authority between the Friendship Heights station of the Red Line of the Washington Metro and Potomac Park or Federal Triangle with late night and early morning 33 trips extending to L'Enfant Plaza station of the Blue, Orange, Silver, Green and Yellow Lines of the Washington Metro. Both lines operate at 10-12 minute frequencies between 7AM and 9PM, while route 33 operates every 15-30 minutes after 9PM. Route 31 trips are roughly 45 minutes long, while route 33 trips are 55 minutes long.

Background
Routes 31 and 33 operate from  station and Potomac Park (31) or Federal Triangle (33) daily with late night and early morning 33 trips extending to L'Enfant Plaza station daily. Their main purpose is to provide service to the upper Northwest side via Wisconsin Avenue NW. The second half of the 30 routes that run along Pennsylvania Avenue into Southeast is provided by routes 32, 34, and 36. Route 31 operates on weekdays while Route 33 operates daily.

Routes 31 and 33 currently operate out of Western division which utilizes New Flyer D40LFRs, DE40LFAs, and XDE40s.

Route 31 stops

Route 33 stops

History

Along with being one of the most popular bus lines in D.C., the 30 series line is also one of the oldest operating routes in the city, having it incorporated from streetcar lines and the Washington and Georgetown Railroad in the 1860s and ran by buses beginning in 1936. As of 2008, the line has more than 20,000 passengers a day.

The five routes, 30, 32, 34, 35, and 36, begin their journey at Friendship Heights station and end at Potomac Avenue station (30), Southern Avenue station (32), or Naylor Road station (34, 35, and 36). WMATA launched a study on the Pennsylvania Avenue line in 2008 to improve services and to reduce delays and bus bunchings.

Route 31
Route 31 was introduced on June 29, 2008 dubbed as a "neighborhood connector" as part of an overhaul of the busy Pennsylvania Avenue Line. Route 31 connects Friendship Heights station to Potomac Park to provide help to routes 32 and 36 along Wisconsin Avenue and replace routes 30, 34, and 35.

Route 33
As part of proposals from 2013 to simplify the Wisconsin Avenue Line again, route 33 was introduced on August 24, 2014 to replace the 32 and 36 portion along Wisconsin Avenue and to provide extra service to the 31, and the newly introduced Friendship Heights–Southeast Line or routes 30N and 30S. Route 33 provides more service between Friendship Heights station and Federal Triangle to help out the 30N, 30S, and 31. Routes 32 and 36 were shorten to Potomac Park being replaced by routes 30N, 30S, 31, and 33.

Changes
During the COVID-19 pandemic, routes 31 and 33 operated on their Saturday supplemental schedule during the weekdays beginning on March 16, 2020. On March 18, 2020, the line was further reduced to operate on its Sunday schedule. Weekend service was later suspended on March 21, 2020 being replaced by Routes 30N and 30S. On August 23, 2020, routes 31 and 33 restored its regular schedule but Route 31 weekend service was suspended being replaced by Route 33.

On September 26, 2020, WMATA proposed to eliminate all route 31 weekend service and add route 33 trips due to low federal funding in response to the COVID-19 pandemic. Weekday service will not change.

On September 5, 2021, the line was increased to operate every 12 minutes daily.

On May 29, 2022, all late night route 33 service was extended to terminate at L'Enfant Plaza station via 7th Street.

Incidents
On June 3, 2022, a man was stabbed on board a 33 bus along Wisconsin Avenue near Newark Street NW. He was taken to the hospital in serious condition. The suspect fled the scene.

References

External links
 Metrobus
 The Metrobus 30s Line Study, sponsored by the Washington Metropolitan Area Transit Authority in conjunction with the District of Columbia Department of Transportation

Street railways in Washington, D.C.
31
1862 establishments in Washington, D.C.